Markar Aghajanyan (born March 4, 1965) is a retired Iranian football player and manager of Armenian descent.

Career

Aghajanyan spent most of his career playing for Ararat Tehran FC. He later went on to join a series of Tehran-based teams, most notably PAS, where he won the Iran Pro League division in his first season.

With the departure of Human Afazeli, Aghajanyan was appointed the manager of Azadegan League side Damash Lorestan. The team chose not to renew his contract for the 2010–11 season.

Aghajanyan was also a part of the coaching staff for the Iranian national football team, and he was the assistant coach during the 2014, 2018 FIFA World Cups.

References

External sources

 

1965 births
Living people
Sportspeople from Tehran
Ethnic Armenian sportspeople
Iranian footballers
Iranian people of Armenian descent
Iran international footballers
F.C. Ararat Tehran players
Pas players
Association football defenders
Iranian football managers
Gahar Zagros F.C. managers
Damash Gilan managers
Bahman players